The 2017–18 Slovak Basketball League season was the 26th season of the top-tier basketball competition in Slovakia. Inter Bratislava was the defending champion, but was eliminated in the semifinals. Levickí Patrioti won their second league.

Competition format
Ten teams joined the regular season, consisted in playing against each other four times home-and-away in double a round-robin format. The eight first qualified teams advance to the playoffs.

Teams

Lučenec and SPU Nitra did not continue in the Extraliga. Žilina, champion of the 1.Liga, replaced them.

Regular season

Playoffs
Seeded teams played games 1, 3, 5 and 7 at home. Quarterfinals were played in a best-of-five games format while semifinals and final with a best-of-seven one.

Slovak clubs in Regional competitions

References

External links
Slovak Extraliga official website

Slovak
Basketball
Slovak Extraliga (basketball)